Hajós is a town in Bács-Kiskun County, Hungary.

History 

Hajós's name comes from the Hungarian word "hajó" which means boat or ship. It is possible that in the Middle Ages Hajós was surrounded by a large area of water. The medieval Hajós lost much of its population during the Ottoman conquest. The Ancestors of the Hajoscher Danube Swabians came in 1720 from different parts of Swabia, and was of entirely  Catholic Swabians immigrants origin and settled there and hold until today their own Old Swabian German dialect.

Tourism 

There are over 1,200 press houses built in village structure. The taste of the ripening fiery wine in the coolness of the cellars are offered by this region. This is the place where every stranger deserves a "Grüsgott." On the rich blooded Urban day wine festival, tens of thousands of people celebrate Saint Urban, the guardian of grape growers and wine makers.

References

External links 

  in Hungarian and German
 Aerial photography: Hajós

Populated places in Bács-Kiskun County
Hungarian German communities
Towns in Hungary